Voya or VOYA can mean:

Voya Financial - A spinoff created from the North American banking operations of the ING Group (cf.)
Voice of Youth Advocates - a bimonthly magazine for young adults